Ken and Neal Skupski were the defending champions but lost in the semifinals to Frederik Nielsen and Joe Salisbury.

Nielsen and Salisbury won the title after defeating Austin Krajicek and Jeevan Nedunchezhiyan 7–6(7–5), 6–1 in the final.

Seeds

Draw

References
 Main Draw

Nottingham Open - Men's Doubles
2018 Men's Doubles
2018 Nottingham Open